Clifton Robinsons Hockey Club is a field hockey club based at Westbury-on-Trym in Bristol. It was formed by the merging of Clifton Ladies Hockey Club and Robinsons Hockey Club. The clubs had shared close links for many years, sharing pitches, umpires, coaches and annual dinners and in summer 2016 joined to form a single club.

The Ladies' 1st XI play in the Women's England Hockey League 
 and the Men's 1st XI play in the Men's England Hockey League. The club fields five ladies' and six men's league sides and junior teams.

As Clifton Ladies, the club has won the Women's Cup on four occasions (1998, 2000, 2016 and 2019) and was runner-up in 1996, 1997, 2005, 2013 and 2015. They also finished runner-up in the 1997-98 Women's National League.

Current team

Ladies First Team Squad 2022–23 season

Major National Honours
National League
 1997–98 Women's League Runner-Up

National Cup
 1995–96 Women's National Cup Runner-Up
 1996–97 Women's National Cup Runner-Up
 1997–98 Women's National Cup Winners
 1999–00 Women's National Cup Winners
 2004–05 Women's National Cup Runner-Up
 2012–13 Women's National Cup Runner-Up
 2014–15 Women's National Cup Runner-Up
 2015–16 Women's National Cup Winners
 2018-19 Women's National Cup Winners
 2019–20 Women's Cup Runner-Up

National Tournaments
 1998–99 Women's Premiership Tournament Runner-Up

Notable players

Women's internationals

Past squads

Ladies First Team Squad 2020–21 season

 (captain)

References

English field hockey clubs
Field hockey clubs established in 2016